Bettina Lemström (born 29 March 1966) is a Finnish sailor. She competed in the women's 470 event at the 1988 Summer Olympics.

References

External links
 

1966 births
Living people
Finnish female sailors (sport)
Olympic sailors of Finland
Sailors at the 1988 Summer Olympics – 470
Sportspeople from Helsinki